Stars over Hollywood is a radio anthology in the United States. It was broadcast on CBS from May 31, 1941, to September 25, 1954, sponsored first by Dari-Rich, Carnation Milk and later by Armour and Company. (Note: This program should not be confused with Stars over Hollywood, a 15-minute dramatic serial, produced via electrical transcription by C. P. MacGregor Electrical Transcriptions.)

Format
Comedies and light romances were typical episodes for Stars over Hollywood. The presentations were "casual and relaxed ... but the performances were very professional." Each of the program's scripts was original.

The show's success surprised many doubters, who thought that audiences would not listen to this type of broadcast on Saturday mornings, a time that has been described as "the ghetto of the schedule." The program lasted 13 years at the same time (12:30 pm, Eastern Time). Following the lead of Stars over Hollywood, other dramas, such as Armstrong Theater of Today and Grand Central Station, found success on Saturdays.

Personnel
As the title implies, the program featured "major Hollywood stars." As an anthology, Stars over Hollywood had no recurring cast. A 1943 newspaper ad promised, "Each week you'll find a Hollywood star in the leading role of a new story."

Actors and actresses who appeared in leading roles during the program's run included Alan Ladd, Anita Louise, Mary Astor, Phil Harris, Merle Oberon, and Basil Rathbone. Supporting actors, most of whom were regulars on radio, included Lurene Tuttle, Janet Waldo, and Eve McVeagh. A 1953 newspaper article commented: "The phenomenal success of the program is due largely to the stars themselves, who like the show's family appeal. More than 50 top name personalities have come back for a second and sometimes third performance."

The program's host was Knox Manning. Announcers were Jim Bannon, Art Gilmore, Frank Goss, Marvin Miller, Art Ballinger, and Scott Douglas. Producer-directors were Les Mitchel, Paul Pierce, and Don Clark. Music directors were Del Castillo, Rex Koury, and Ivan Ditmars.

References

External links

Logs
 Episodic log of Stars over Hollywood from Jerry Haendiges Vintage Radio Logs
 Episodic log of Stars over Hollywood from RadioGOLDINdex.

Stories
During Stars over Hollywood's time on the air, Radio Mirror magazine published a number of stories based on episodes from the program. The following are links to a few of those stories.
 "A New Love Song"
 "Emily's Husband"
 "Lost Christmas"
 "Our Love Was New"
 "To Be Really Yours"

Streaming episodes
 Episodes of Stars over Hollywood available via streaming from Internet Archive
 Episodes of Stars over Hollywood available via streaming from Old Time Radio Researchers Library

1940s American radio programs
1950s American radio programs
American radio dramas
CBS Radio programs
Anthology radio series